Jennifer Justine Musk (née Wilson; born September 2, 1972) is a Canadian author.

Early life
Justine Wilson was born in Peterborough, Ontario, Canada and she spent most of her early life there. She attended Queen's University in Kingston and obtained a degree in English literature. She then moved to Japan where she taught English as a second language (ESL) before finally settling in California.

Career 
Wilson is the author of the contemporary fantasy novel BloodAngel, published in 2005 by the Roc Books imprint of Penguin Books. Her second book, Uninvited, was released in 2007 and is an unrelated work intended for young-adult readers. A sequel to BloodAngel, Lord of Bones, was released in 2008. Musk was one of the first people to use a site like Pinterest to plan out a novel.

In a 2007 interview, she identified Margaret Atwood, Joyce Carol Oates, Paul Theroux, George R.R. Martin, Guy Gavriel Kay, and Neil Gaiman as authors to whom she could relate her writings. She also described her books as cross-genre fiction.

Personal life 
In January 2000, Wilson married Elon Musk. Their first child was born in 2002 and died of SIDS at the age of 10 weeks. Through in vitro fertilization, she gave birth to twins in 2004 and to triplets in 2006. On September 13, 2008, she announced that she and Musk were getting a divorce. She and Musk share custody of their children.

Wilson later wrote an article for Marie Claire detailing ways she thought the marriage was unhealthy, such as Musk's dismissal of her career ambitions, his description of himself as the "alpha" in the relationship, and his pressure for her to become a trophy wife. In 2010, she described herself as a "model former wife", and said she was on good terms with Musk's then-wife, Talulah Riley. 

She has stated that she kept the last name Musk for the sake of their children. In 2022, one of their twins officially changed her name to reflect her gender identity, and took Wilson as her surname because she no longer wished to be associated with her father.

Bibliography

Notes

References

External links 
 
 

1972 births
Living people
21st-century Canadian women writers
Canadian expatriate writers in the United States
Canadian fantasy writers
Canadian women novelists
Chick lit writers
People from Peterborough, Ontario
People from Bel Air, Los Angeles
Women science fiction and fantasy writers
Writers from Ontario
Musk family